Nudgee can refer to:

Nudgee, Queensland (Suburb of Brisbane, Australia)
St. Joseph's Nudgee College, Brisbane, Australia
Electoral district of Nudgee, Queensland, Australia